Robert Wieland (born 4 September 1974 in Melbourne) is an Australian sport shooter. He tied for 27th place in the men's 10 metre air rifle event at the 2000 Summer Olympics.

References

1974 births
Living people
ISSF rifle shooters
Australian male sport shooters
Olympic shooters of Australia
Shooters at the 2000 Summer Olympics